Suthep is a tambon (subdistrict) of Mueang Chiang Mai District, in Chiang Mai Province, Thailand. In 2005 it had a total population of 36,952 people. The tambon contains 15 villages, including Doi Pui and others.

References

Tambon of Chiang Mai province
Populated places in Chiang Mai province